Operation Gothic Serpent was a military operation conducted in Mogadishu, Somalia, by an American force code-named Task Force Ranger during the Somali Civil War in 1993. The primary objective of the operation was to capture Mohamed Farrah Aidid, a Somalia clan leader who was wanted by the Unified Task Force in response to his attacks against United Nations troops. The operation took place from August to October 1993 and was led by US Joint Special Operations Command (JSOC).

On 3 October 1993, the task force executed a mission to capture two of Aidid's lieutenants. The mission ultimately culminated in what became known as the 1993 Battle of Mogadishu. The battle was extremely bloody and the task force inflicted massive casualties on Somali militia forces, while suffering heavy losses themselves. The Malaysian, Pakistani, and conventional US Army troops under UNOSOM II which aided in TF Ranger's extraction suffered losses as well, though not as heavy. Overall, the Somali National Alliance achieved a strategic victory as the battle resulted in the withdrawal of American troops during 1994. The aftermath of this confrontation shifted American foreign policy and led to an eventual termination of the United Nations mission in Somalia in 1995. At the time, the Battle of Mogadishu was the most intense, bloodiest single firefight involving US troops since Vietnam.

Background
In December 1992, US President George H. W. Bush ordered the military to join the UN in a joint operation known as Operation Restore Hope, with the primary mission of restoring order in Somalia. The country was racked by civil war and a severe famine as it was ruled by a number of faction leaders. Over the next several months, the situation deteriorated.

During the early months of 1993, all the parties involved in the civil war agreed to a disarmament conference held in Addis Ababa, Ethiopa. Enactment of the agreed upon terms, however, was not so easily achieved. One particularly powerful party, the Somali National Alliance, formed in 1992 and led by Mohamed Farah Aidid, was a particularly belligerent faction. This alliance consisted of faction leaders across the country operating under Aidid's. A great number of Somali civilians also resented the international forces, leading many, including women and children, to take up arms and actively resist US forces during fighting in Mogadishu.

On 5 June 1993, one of the deadliest attacks on UN forces in Somalia occurred when 24 Pakistani soldiers were ambushed and killed in an Aidid-controlled area of Mogadishu. Any hope of a peaceful resolution of the conflict quickly vanished. The next day, the UN Security Council issued Resolution 837, calling for the arrest and trial of those who carried out the ambush. US warplanes and UN troops began an attack on Aidid's stronghold. Aidid remained defiant, and the violence between Somalis and UN forces escalated.

Task Force Ranger
On 8 August 1993, Aidid's militia detonated a remote controlled bomb against a US Army vehicle, killing four Military Policemen. On 19 August, a second bomb attack injured four more soldiers. And on 22 August, a third attack occurred, injuring 6 US soldiers. In response, President Clinton approved Operation Gothic Serpent, which would deploy a 441 man special task force, named Task Force Ranger, to hunt down and capture Aidid. By this time, however, circumstances on the ground had changed significantly and Aidid was in hiding, no longer appearing publicly.

On 22 August, advance forces were deployed to Somalia followed shortly after by the main force on 25 August. The task force was handled as a strategic asset and led by Major General William F. Garrison, head of JSOC, and was not under UN command or the command of US General Thomas M. Montgomery, the deputy commander of UNOSOM II forces as well as commander of US forces in Somalia. Instead, Garrison and TF Ranger received orders directly from CENTCOM.

The force consisted of:
 B Company, 3rd Battalion, 75th Ranger Regiment
 C Squadron, 1st Special Forces Operational Detachment-Delta (1st SFOD-D) (also called Delta Force)
 1st Battalion, 160th Special Operations Aviation Regiment (160th SOAR), which included 8 MH-60 Black Hawks, 4 AH-6 Little Birds, and 4 MH-6 Little Birds
 Naval Special Warfare Development Group (DEVGRU) SEALs
 24th Special Tactics Squadron pararescuemen and combat controllers

The task force had intelligence support from a joint effort between CIA officers and Intelligence Support Activity.

Early missions
In Mogadishu, the task force occupied an old hangar and construction trailers under primitive conditions, without access to potable water.

Only days after arriving, on 28 August, Somali militia launched a mortar attack on the hangar at 19:27 which injured four Rangers. These mortar attacks became a regular occurrence but rarely caused any further significant injuries.

The task force launched its first raid at 03:09 on 30 August, hitting the Lig Ligato house. There, they captured 9 individuals along with weapons, drugs, communications gear, and other equipment. They were highly embarrassed, however, when it was found out that the prisoners they had taken were actually UN employees. Regardless of the fact that the employees were in a restricted area and were found with weapons and drugs, the incident was ridiculed in the media. Colin Powell, the Chairman of the Joint Chiefs of Staff, was reportedly so upset he "had to screw myself off the ceiling".

Missions followed on 6 September, with a raid on an old Russian compound; 14 September, when they raided the Jialiou house/police station; 17 September, with a raid on Radio Mogadishu; 18 September, a raid on the garages of Osman Atto's (Aidid's financier); and 21 September when they captured Osman Atto himself. Local intelligence assets had given Atto a cane that concealed a hidden locating beacon. Delta operators tracked his vehicle convoy via helicopter and disabled Atto's vehicle with shots to its engine block before taking him into custody. This was also the first known takedown of a moving vehicle from a helicopter.

To obfuscate when exactly a mission would occur, Garrison had the 160th SOAR conduct flights with soldiers aboard multiple times per day so militia could not rely solely on seeing helicopters to know that a raid was going to occur. They also varied their insertion and extraction tactics, using various permutations of ground vehicle and helicopter-based infil and exfil.

At approximately 0200 on 25 September, Aidid's men shot down a Black Hawk with an RPG and killed three crew members at New Port near Mogadishu, though the two pilots, who were both injured, managed to escape and evade to reach friendly units. Pakistani and US forces secured the area and were able to evacuate the casualties. The helicopter and crew were from 9th Battalion, 101st Aviation Regiment and 2nd Battalion, 25th Aviation Regiment, and not part of the Task Force Ranger mission, but the helicopter's destruction was still a huge psychological victory for the SNA.

Battle of Mogadishu

On the afternoon of 3 October 1993, informed that two lieutenants of Aidid's clan were at a residence in the "Black Sea" neighborhood in Mogadishu, the task force sent 19 aircraft, 12 vehicles, and 160 men to capture them. The two Somali lieutenants alongside 22 others were quickly captured and loaded on a convoy of ground vehicles. However, armed militiamen and civilians, some of them women and children, converged on the target area from all over the city. Shortly before the mission was to be concluded, an MH-60 Black Hawk, Super Six One, was shot down by a Somali combatant using a rocket-propelled grenade (RPG). Both of the pilots were killed on impact, but the crew survived the crash landing.

Shortly afterward, another Black Hawk helicopter, Super Six Four, was shot down by an RPG fired from the ground. No rescue team was immediately available, and the small surviving crew, including one of the pilots, Michael Durant, couldn't move. Two Delta snipers, Master Sergeant Gary Gordon and Sergeant First Class Randy Shughart, provided cover from a helicopter and repeatedly volunteered to secure the crash site. Upon their third request the two were finally granted permission to be inserted. The two men made their way to the crash site, quickly establishing a perimeter, and securing the surviving crew.  The crash site came under heavy attack from the Somali militia, despite attempts from the 160th helicopters overhead to hold back the mob. MSG Gordon, SFC Shughart, and the surviving crew of Super 64 were overwhelmed and killed, save for CW3 Durant who was taken hostage. Shughart and Gordon were both posthumously awarded the Medal of Honor for their actions.

Meanwhile, the remaining Rangers and Delta operators fought their way to the first crash site. Repeated attempts by the Somalis to overrun US positions were beaten back with heavy small arms fire accompanied by close air support from helicopters. A rescue convoy was organized, bolstered by UNOSOM II forces, including the 19th Battalion, Royal Malay Regiment (Mech);, Pakistani 15 FF Regiment and a squadron of Patton tanks from 19th Lancers; and US Army 2nd Battalion, 14th Infantry, 10th Mountain Division (which included elements of 1st Battalion, 87th Infantry; 41st Engineer Battalion; and 2nd Battalion, 25th Aviation). In heavy combat with the Somalis, the rescue convoy broke through and extracted the besieged forces.

The mission's objective of capturing Aidid's associates was accomplished, but the battle turned out to be the most difficult close combat that US troops had engaged in since the Vietnam War. In the end, four MH-60 Black Hawks were shot down with two crashing in the city, 9 members of TF Ranger were killed (as were 1 Malaysian soldier and 2 US soldiers from UNOSOM), 6 were MIA (5 later confirmed KIA and 1 POW), and dozens were wounded (2 of whom would later succumb to their injuries). Somali casualties were estimated to be 314 killed and 812 wounded (including civilians), though figures do vary. The American public was outraged at the failure and demanded a withdrawal.

6 October mortar attack
Two days after the battle's end, a Somali mortar strike on their compound killed one Delta Force operator and injured another 12–13 members of TF Ranger.

US withdrawal
Following the battle, President Clinton ordered that additional troops be deployed to protect US soldiers and aid in withdrawal. Negotiations eventually secured the release of the captured pilot POW. In the end, the battle had resulted in 17 KIA and 85–97 wounded for the task force.

Clinton called for a full withdrawal by 31 March 1994. Conforming to this request, most troops were out of the country by 25 March 1994. A few hundred US Marines remained offshore, but all US and United Nations troops were finally removed from the area at the conclusion of Operation United Shield in March 1995.

Legacy
US Secretary of Defense Les Aspin resigned his post late in 1993. He was specifically blamed for denying the US Army permission to have its own armor units in place in Somalia, units which might have been able to break through to the trapped soldiers earlier in the battle. US political leaders had, at the time, felt the presence of tanks would taint the peacekeeping image of the mission.

Osama bin Laden, who was living in Sudan at the time, cited this operation, in particular the US' withdrawal, as an example of American weakness and vulnerability to attack.

References

Bibliography

 
 
 
 
 
 
 
 
 
 
 
 
 
 
 

Gothic Serpent
Wars involving Somalia
Conflicts in 1993
Presidency of Bill Clinton
20th-century military history of the United States
United States Army Rangers
Urban warfare
1993 in Somalia
United Nations operations in Somalia
20th century in Mogadishu
Battle of Mogadishu (1993)
Pakistan military presence in other countries
Government of Benazir Bhutto